Takydromus septentrionalis, the China grass lizard, is a species of lizard in the family Lacertidae. It is endemic to China.

References

Takydromus
Reptiles described in 1864
Taxa named by Albert Günther
Endemic fauna of China
Reptiles of China